Silloth was the terminus of the Carlisle and Silloth Bay Railway, a branch railway from Carlisle, England. The town, dock and station at Silloth were built on a greenfield site after the Carlisle & Silloth Bay Railway & Dock Act (1855) was passed. The railway provision grew with the dock and its later additions.

The station was opened in 1856 and closed by the Beeching axe on 7 September 1964, when it had been estimated in 1962 that the line was losing £23,500 a year and rising, staff costs had been pared to the bone and an imminent track bill of £32,500 was to be faced.

Services
Sample timetables along the branch show typical routine patterns. Unfortunately they are undated:
 the first does not show , suggesting it is after 1 September 1921, nor does it mention the North British, so it may be 1923–1932, when the branch to  closed
 the second matches Bradshaw in 1922
 the third is from British Railways days.

The Winter 1962–3 timetable shows eight trains each way, Monday to Saturday, with a Saturday extra, as well as three trains on Sundays. The table strikes the eye as being simpler than earlier timetables with:
 all trains 2nd Class only
 a much better service to 
 no through trains beyond Carlisle
  had closed in 1955.

The line was one of the first in the country to be dieselised, with one train a day remaining steam-hauled.

The branch was atypical in that from the 1880s successive owners had fostered a vigorous trade in "Specials", the cornerstone of which was Carlisle to Silloth and back for a shilling. This was backed by encouraging outings to Silloth by a wide range of customers such as Sunday schools, Temperance clubs and racegoers. Many specials were both long and well-filled; the longest ever was not a trippers' train, but a celebration train for the reopening of Carr's flour mill in 1905.

Freight traffic, which had done well in wartime, notably because it was on the north west coast, was following the pattern of the rest of the country - in decline. Four camping coaches were positioned here by the London Midland Region from 1956 to 1964. There was insufficient shunting to justify keeping the small locoshed open after 6 July 1953 and erstwhile staple business such as flour traffic from Carr's Mill fell from £7000 to £100 per month, the business being lost to road competition.

All tracks to and in Silloth had been removed by 1968.

Redevelopment
The Allerdale council in northern England passed its final approval on a plan to demolish the remaining structure of the station on 8 December 2006.  The development firm James Morgan Ltd. was awarded a contract to build new single-family housing on the property.   Stuart Hinchliffe, director of the development firm also stated "We will be reinstating as much of the old railway platform as we can, to maintain Silloth’s Victorian history."

See also
 List of closed railway stations in Britain

References

Sources

Further material

External links
 The station on a navigable Edwardian OS map National Library of Scotland
 The station on the branch, with mileages Railway Codes
 The line with period photographs Holme St Cuthbert History Group
 The line and station Cumbrian Railways Association
 Images of the battery and railways in Silloth BBC and others
 1929 aerial view of the station Britain from above (sign-in needed to zoom)
 The station and line Rail Map Online
 DMU at the station pinimg
 The station in its last days Deborah Irwin
 The line in early BR days Deborah Irwin
 The station's and line's history Solway Past and Present
 The line's opening John Ostle
 Early diesels on the line David Heys

Disused railway stations in Cumbria
Former North British Railway stations
Beeching closures in England
Railway stations in Great Britain opened in 1856
Railway stations in Great Britain closed in 1964
Silloth